Theater in Korea or Korean theater are theater performances which were originally done in courtyards, but which have now moved to stages. Korean theater is performed in the Korean language, and is generally made up of Korean people. Rising to prominence in Ancient Korea, Korean theater remains vibrant today and is now gaining popularity around the world.

Korean theater before the 20th century was more 'performance' than 'drama'. There were no plot-driven dramas, and all the performative presentations, including dance, shaman ritual, and circus, were called Nolum (놀음) or Yeonhee (연희), which means 'playing'.

Up until the 19th century, the two leading forms of Korean public theater were Talchum (탈춤) and Pansori (판소리). Talchum literally translates to "mask-dance". Multiple players wearing masks performed a loosely fixed text through dance, dialogue and song. Since the performers were able to conceal their identities, many of the plays that were played were satires. Pansori is a form of storytelling. There is one central performer who, through dialogue and song goes through a whole story and another performer who adds rhythm and mood to the story by beating on a drum and putting in verbal sounds (‘chuimsae’-추임새). Neither Talchum nor Pansori had a fixed script – they were handed down orally from generation to generation.

After Korea opened its doors to the foreign countries in the late 19th century, the first modern indoor theater, Hyopyul-sa (협률사) was built in 1902, and the ‘new plays’ (신극) started to come through. ‘New plays’ was the term Korean thespians used for the Western drama at that time. The proscenium stage was introduced as well as Shakespeare, and there was a movement among the theater practitioners to define a line between the traditional Korean theater and the new wave. Nowadays the traditional forms are continued by the "living national treasures"; people who are selected by the government for having exceptional skill in a traditional art and are funded to pass it down.

Contemporary Korean theater has three main directions. First there are the government funded theaters such as the National Theater of Korea and Seoul Performing Arts Center. The main repertory consists of Korean traditional theater and classics such as Shakespeare and Chekhov. The second direction happens at Daehakro (대학로), the ‘off-Broadway’ or ‘off-off-Broadway’ of Seoul, Korea. Most of the theater that takes place in Daehakro is independent and experimental. The last but largest direction is that of the popular theater. Many corporate companies have built big theater spaces in Seoul that are mainly used to stage big musicals and translations of Broadway hits. But whereas these three categories can give one an idea about contemporary Korean theater, one also needs to keep in mind that the three often intermingle, so sometimes you find experimental theater at a corporate theater and a Broadway musical on Daehakro.
Korean theater has spread across the world and is rising to prominence in other countries such as Australia, U.S.A and England. Oftentimes themes include modernized and revised versions of traditional Korean plays mixed with melodrama.

In Korea, rituals related to shamanism and Totemism began and developed into plays in the agricultural society. This article will explain the development of Korean theater.

The Period of the Three kingdoms in Korea

Goguryeo music (고구려악)
It is a performing art of Goguryeo that is so artistic that it is included in the Seven Bugi (七部伎), Nine Bugi (九部伎), and Ten Bugi (十部伎) of the Sui and Tang Dynasties of China. (Ten Bugi is a ten-piece performing arts established by King Taejong of the Tang dynasty between 11th and 16th (637-642) in Jeonggwan. It is also called a duodenum.) Goguryeo music had its own side, which was different from Western music. In other words, Goguryeo music originally accepted Western music, but it seems to have developed in combination with the traditional music of Goguryeo and established new music. In addition, Goguryeo had Western musical instruments and masks, so the names Baekje and Silla music disappeared from Japan and were introduced to the name of Goryeoak (高麗樂, Komogaku). Hoseonmu is a representative of Goguryeo music. Hoseonmu of Goguryeo is a play where a player stands on a ball and spins as fast as the wind. However, Hoseonmu did not necessarily include dancing on the ball. It could be performed on the floor, but it involved a dancer that rotated fast like the wind.

Baekje music (백제악)  
In 554, four Baekje musicians were dispatched to the Japanese government to teach Hoengjeok (횡적), Gunhu (군후), Makmok (막목), and dancing. In 612, Mimaji (미마지), a Baekje man, delivered to Japan an instrumental music that he learned from the Five Kingdoms of China. Gunhu taught by Baekje musicians turned out to be Geomungo, while Makmok (막목) was found to be DoPiPiri (도피피리), while instrumental music taught by Mimaji is a type of masquerade play like Korean Sandaedogam play (삼대도감놀이) or Bongsan mask dance (봉산탈춤). The mask of Giak-dance (기악무) is currently being delivered to Tōdaiji, Japan.

Silla music (신라악) 
Silla unified the three kingdoms in the late 7th century and collected the music of Gaya, Baekje, and Goguryeo together, most of which were handed down to later generations as Silla music. Although the details of Gammu Baek-hee, which was played at Palgwanhoe, are not known in detail, the remaining events in the record include "Gummu (=sword dance)", "Muaemu", "Cheoyongmu", and Ogi.

"A sword dance (검무 Korean : Gummu)" is known as "Hwangchang dance (황창무)", and finds its origin in "Donggyeong gambling (동경잡기)" and "an enlargement literature note (증보문헌비고)", which states that a seven-year-old boy named Hwang Chang-rang of Silla killed the Baekje king under the guise of sword dance and was killed by the Baekje people, so the Silla people were reluctant to wear masks and imitate his dance. However, it is presumed to have originated from the fact that the real soldier, Gwanchang, was actually a true hero. It can be seen that "a sword dance (검무)" was not merely a sword dance, such as a simple battle mission or a dragon sword trick, but rather a mask-wearing, more theatrical mask dance Gumhui (검희). A sword dance was passed down from the private sector to the royal court during the reign of King Sunjo of the Joseon Dynasty, and was passed down by gisaeng until the end of the Joseon Dynasty.

Even after entering the palace, he used a sword that had no abrasion and had no sword, and he wore a vestibule, a vestibule, and a vestibule, and raised the sword, but Mutae was changed to a gentle movement of the Yeommu rather than the gallantry as a mumu.

As for the origin of "Muae-dance (무애무)," there is a story of acting related to Wonhyo (원효) in "The History of the Three Kingdoms," but "Goryosa (고려사)" and "The Treasures of Evil Studies" reveal that "Muae-dance(무애무)" originated from the West and used a lot of non-verbal words. In addition, the dance is described as a dance in which various colors of silk cloth is waved at the top of the whistle gourd and various colors of dance moves, but it can be seen that the dance has already been performed as a musical instrument of this place, which has been transformed from the purpose of Buddhist painting to entertainment. "Muae-mu" increased to 12 people during the Goryeo and Joseon periods, and the lyrics of the Buddhist family, which was sung while dancing, were also changed to a song to celebrate the prosperity of the royal family. Records such as "The Annals of King Sejong" in 16 August indicate that the dance was quite entertaining not only in the royal court but also in the temple.

"Cheoyongmu (Cheoyong dance)", one of the royal dances, is performed on stage today, but it was originally a dance that was performed to drive away evil spirits from the annual royal court and to pray for peace or to pray for good luck in Narye, a ritual to exorcise evil spirits on the New Year's Eve of the lunar calendar. East Sea the (龍王) the son of a person with smallpox Cheoyong (處容) the dance and sing the goddess of smallpox that carry (疫神) survived human wife was from South Korea.A Cheoyongmu is based on the Direction of the Horse of the North, south, east and west and central (五方) that symbolize the five colors of the yellow, red, black, blue and white dress of five. The men are dance.

Dancers wear red bean porridge with white teeth, tin earrings, and black satin on lead bead necklaces, with two peony flowers and seven peach berries on top of their parents' wives, which are meant to exorcise evil spirits and welcome auspicious energy. Cheoyongmu is luxurious and lively through various forms, accompaniment music with beats, and colorful lyrical songs with occasional inserts. Cheoyongmu embodied a Confucian philosophy represented by the Five-Hingseol, while forming a part of a broader folk belief surrounding Cheoyong, including a folk belief that it was possible to defeat the mutual relationship with Yeosung. The production process of Cheoyong Tal is also a valuable opportunity to see the skills of traditional craftsmen.

Goryeo Dynasty

A Korean mask drama (산대잡극)  
In the 33rd volume of "Mokgeunjip (목건집)" by Yi Saek (이색) (1328-1396) at the end of the Goryeo Dynasty, the historical drama from Dongdaemun (동대문) to the palace gate was never seen before. It is appropriate to interpret it as meaning that it was not first taken into custody at this time, but rather that it was a new aspect that had never been seen before. At the end of the Goryeo Dynasty, Baekhee gambling (백희잡기) reached a higher level than the previous period, and this was called Sandaejapgeuk.

Nuo opera (나희) 
Changsha and Ai Chorani performed their own masks and exorcisms, and after the ceremony, various musicians entered the second part to perform the performance of Gamu Baekhee (가무백희). Other than acrobatics, such as the obang Gwimu, acrobatics such as swallowing fire, mask play by Westerners, Chinese Dapgyo (답교) play, Cheoyongmu (처용무) and Baeksumu (백수무) dance are held, and all except acrobatics and daegyo (답교) are mask dance or mask dance. The characters of mask play during the Goryeo Dynasty were diverse.

An auspicious ceremony (가희) 
It was Cho-hee who showed the beginning of Korea's traditional painting style with a play centered on jokes, not just dancing. In April 1165 (the 19th year of King Uijong's reign), various people's games included a ritual offering game in which the eunuchs from left to right set up a house as a contest and foreign residents came to Goryeo to offer their tribute.

Choseon Dynasty

SanDaeNaHee (산대나희)Naming God 
During the Joseon Dynasty, when the policy was adopted, rituals such as Yeondeunghoe (Lotus Lantern Festival) and Palgwanhoe of Goryeo were not inherited, but Sandaejapgeuk and Narye were inherited and became more prevalent. In Joseon, Narye Dokgam or Sandae Dokgam manage Narye, so the names are mixed with Sandae Japhui, Sandae Narye, and Nahee.

It was also held during the reign of Gye-dong Naryeui, during the reign of King Bumyo, during the reign of Ritual Professions at Jongmyo, during the reign of Alseong and other events, and during the reception of Chinese envoys, during the reception of Chinese envoys, during the reign of Antai, during the reign of King Jinpung, and during various occasions of new thanksgiving, and during the new thanksgiving.

In the book "Chosunbu," which was visited in March 1488 (the 19th year of King Seongjong's reign), Seonghyeon's "Jihui" refers to the head of animals such as Tohwa and Gomnori, Mudong, Geundu, Jultagi, and Jukma, among the contents of the mountain Narye he saw in 1488 (the 19th year of King Seongjong's reign).

Pansori (판소리) 
On 24 December 1964, it was designated as Important Intangible Cultural Property (now National Intangible Cultural Property) No.5, and on 7 November 2003, it was selected as UNESCO's "Humanity and Intangible Heritage of the World" and designated as a World Intangible Heritage.

Pansori is a genre of folk art that has developed based on the unique tunes of the Namdo region since the mid-Joseon Dynasty, and is sung by a clown over a couple of hours in Changgeukjo with a certain content and gestures to the rhythm of a master.

Based on the local melodies of South Korea, it changes according to the seven rhythms of Jinyangjo, Jungmori, Gagok 881, Jajinmori, Hwimori, Umori, Eotmori, and Eotjungmori, and increases the dramatic effect with Aniri and Balim, which are said to refer only to the lines at this time.

The origin of pansori was around the time of King Sukjong of the Joseon Dynasty, when various common folk cultures began to flourish, including Chunhyangga, Simcheongga, Heungbu (Park Taryeong), Tobyeolga (Sugunga: Rabbit Taryeong), Jeokbyeokga, Jangki Taryeong, and Byeongangsooryeong.

As the singing of songs became popular due to the spread of the singing style of songs, master singers such as Han Ha-dam, Choi Seon-dal, and Wu Chun-dae came out to set the foundation for pansori during and after the reign of King Sunjo, and after the reign of King Sunjo, Gosugwan, Song Heung-rok, Yeom Gye-dal, etc.

In the late Joseon Dynasty, Shin Jae-hyo reorganized the system until that time and converted 12 Madangsori into 6 madangs, including Chunhyangga, Simcheongga, Baktaryeong, Garujigi Taryeong, Rabbit Taryeong, and Jeokbyeokga, so that the clowns can feel the great literature and the phrase. In addition, there is also a family of Yi Sun-yu, who is missing "Byeongangsoe Taryeong" from Pansori's six yard, and this is the five remaining Pansori madang.

Originally, pansori was developed in the south of the central region, and many clowns were from Jeolla-do, and it has been sung for nearly a century since Shin Jae-hyo. After Wongaksa Temple in Gwangmu Year, pansori has been produced in the form of Changgeuk in the form of Changgeuk, but it is strictly different from Pansori.

a Korean folk drama (민속극)

It can be confirmed that folk plays originated from various primitive religious rituals, such as farming rituals and funerals.

In Korea, such examples are the theatrical styles that originated from Pungnong, Pungoje (Dongje, etc.) and Sangjerye, etc. and developed into entertainment. In other words, folk puppet plays, shadow plays, pansori, etc. are included in such folk plays, including masquerade plays.

There are other things to include in folk plays, such as nongak, or shambles or Japoknori. This is because the Korean exorcism has a strong artistic aspect, so there are many elements of mask play and dramatic elements with distinct themes.

As such, folk plays refer to a kind of early form of propitious theater style. Therefore, it is characterized by its focus on expressiveness, such as dance and mime, rather than literature. That's why folk plays are included in gubi literature. Folk plays are highly playful because they have all been taken away as part of the festival.

Modern theater

Establishment of Theater and New Drama Movement
When explaining modern Korean dramas, it is necessary to talk about the establishment of the theater first because classical plays were folk plays in the form of outdoor yard play, but only after the opening of the outdoor stage was established, the modern character of the play developed.

The theater was first established in 1902 as Hyeopryulsa, the imperial theater company, which was established to celebrate the 40th anniversary of Emperor Gojong's ascension. Hyeopryulsa formed an exclusive organization with 170 people from all over the country, including masters, singers, and dancers.

Within the exclusive organization headed by Kim Chang-hwan, there were almost all the best masters and singers, including Song Man-gap, Lee Dong-baek, Kang Yong-hwan, and Heo Geum-pa.

Originally practicing for the celebration of the imperial family, they changed Hyeopryulsa Temple to a general theater after it was lost due to various circumstances. Since then, various problems have arisen in the aspect of public morals, and the appeal of Lee Pil-hwa ended in three and a half years.

Then, Hyeopryulsa was reopened as a private rental theater called Wongaksa in July 1908. Wongaksa Temple, led by Lee Dong-baek, had 64 members, including 40 men and 24 women, all of whom were masters and master singers. They changed pansori into a dialogue box in line with the trend of the flowering press, and then completely sang and developed into a Changgeuk was developed into a Changgeuk.

It was called Sinyeongeuk because it was more new than traditional pansori, and in November 1908, Yi Injik's "Eun Segye" was called Sinyeongeuk and performed greatly at Wongaksa Temple.

As for "Eun Se-gye," it is not clear whether it is Chang-geuk or Shin (pa) drama, as there are conflicting views that it cannot be seen as the starting point of the new drama and views that it is the beginning of the new drama. However, it is clear that Wongaksa Temple was the birthplace of Changgeuk and served as an important theater for more than two years.

Early soap opera 
The Changgeuk Movement, which was centered on Wongaksa Temple, was pushed back to the provinces and the Sinpa Theater filled the place. Focusing on Seoul before and after the signing of the Eulsa Treaty of 1905, Japanese residents about 150,000 lived in.

As they built theaters such as Sujwa, the large-scale opera troupes flowed into the theater and performed a play against the Japanese, where Korean Im Seong-gu learned the new opera and launched the first theater company in December 1911.

Since then, more than 10 theater companies, including Mun Su-seong of Yoon Baek-nam and Yoo Il-dan of Lee Gi-se, opened the era of Sinpa Theater.

The sentimentalistic neo-fiction drama was able to easily penetrate the public because the theater people translated Japanese works into Korean style and put them on stage, and in the frustrating situation of losing their country, they reached a consensus of tears.

As can be felt in the titles of works such as "Jangangmong," "Bulnyeo Gwi," and "Ssangokru," domestic tragedy was the mainstream, and the translation of Japanese works was overwhelming.

They seemed to have a very utilitarian theater view, such as enlightenment, but in reality, they were only a very pre-modern expression of emotion. Such loyalty, recognition, marital conflict and vulgar love were extremely harmful to the modern awareness and civic awareness of the public.

In other words, it was nothing more than to transmit the tears that the Japanese shed in the past under feudal conditions to our country. In the early days, when "Gold Night Cha" was translated into "Jangmong" (Jo Jung-hwan), which is a typical family tragedy of Japanese neo-fiction dramas, it was very Korean to reunite the two main characters, unlike the original, but gradually changed the Korean mind by falling into Japanese sentiment.

The beginning of a modern play 
As above, Japan's direct import soap opera, which enjoyed the 1910s, quickly declined around the 1 March Movement. This can be seen for two main reasons: soap opera itself has no longer developed as a popular art, and the other is that it was inflamed by the relics of pre-modern sentiment, depending on the wide national awareness.

Thus, the new theatrical people began to wander to the provinces after the final self-rescue plan, the series, failed. On the other hand, international students who studied modern literature in Japan directly imported Western modern dramas as part of the national movement and attempted realistic plays. One example of this is the movement of students' pilgrimage, such as the Dongwoohoe, Hyeongseolhoe, and Galdophoe in the early 1920s.

They used their vacation to work on a limited basis, when the rider was playwright Kim Woo-jin. After that, he continued to introduce modern Western dramas, and he committed suicide in 1926 after engaging in brilliant activities such as writing the first expressionist works in Korea, leading to the collapse of the experimental theater movement.

However, despite these setbacks, conscious theater troupes such as Towolhoe (founded in July 1927) were born, and the theater industry of the 1920s was still lively. In addition, Park Seung-hui and Yi Seo-gu, who returned from studying literature and theater in Tokyo, attempted realistic plays through the Towolhoe. Their plays were far more advanced than traditional dramas such as realistic stage settings and acting.

Creative plays gradually began to be staged, and pure playwrights were born one by one. It can be said that Hyeon-cheol's training of actors played a part in the background of this Towolhoe play. In other words, the Joseon Actor's School, which was founded in 1924, raised several actors.

But the Towolhoe soon flowed into a commercial play, and was more of a romantic movement than a realism. However, it declined in the late 1920s, and soon after, the theater art research group, founded in 1931, appeared.

Twelve young literary artists, led by overseas literary circles such as Yu Chi-jin, Seo Hang-seok and Lee Heon-gu, launched a theatrical organization with the slogan of establishing a new play by accepting modern Western dramas.

The Institute of Drama and Arts, which created a true modern drama among the Sinpa Theater Troupe and proletarian theater groups that raised their heads again, began to establish a solid foundation for theater history in the land by practicing the theater's cultivation, commercial drama purification, popular enlightenment, and traditional and modern performances.

It was also the Drama Research Institute that trained professional playwrights such as Yu Chi-jin, Kim Jin-su, Lee Kwang-rae, and Ham Se-deok. However, these dramatic arts research groups were also disbanded in 1939 due to Japanese oppression. At this very time, many famous Western playwrights were introduced, allowing our plays to escape the narrow framework of commercial dramas.

it is common to use the phrase "Vao Nai" before a show, which translates loosely to "Father’s Blessing", although it is colloquially translated as "Papa’s Blessings". The phrase functions similarly to, "Break a leg!".

See also 
 Hyopyul-sa
 National Theater of Korea
 Jump (comic martial-arts performance)

References 

Theatre